Shan Liu is a village in the Plover Cove area of Tai Po District, Hong Kong.

Administration
Shan Liu is one of the villages represented within the Tai Po Rural Committee. For electoral purposes, Shan Liu is part of the Shuen Wan constituency, which was formerly represented by So Tat-leung until October 2021.

Shan Liu (including Lai Pek Shan and Lai Pek Shan San Tsuen) is a recognized village under the New Territories Small House Policy.

History
Historically, Ting Kok, together with the nearby Hakka villages of Shan Liu, Lai Pik Shan, Lo Tsz Tin, Lung Mei and Tai Mei Tuk belonged to the Ting Kok Yeuk alliance.

Shan Liu was flooded as a consequence of heavy rains in July 2017. About 30 trapped residents were evacuated by Fire Services teams.

References

Further reading
 Town Planning Appeal No.16 of 2011 documents an appeal under section 17B of the Town Planning Ordinance against the refusal by the Town Planning Board of an application for planning permission to build a proposed house (New Territories Exempted House - Small House) on a piece of government land in Shan Liu Village, Tai Po. It provides insights into aspects of the Small House Policy

External links
 Delineation of area of existing village Shan Liu (Tai Po) for election of resident representative (2019 to 2022)

Villages in Tai Po District, Hong Kong